The Basketball Bundesliga GmbH is a governing body for basketball in Germany. It directs the 18 professional German basketball sports clubs of the top-tier German Basketball League.

History
The Basketball Bundesliga BBL was founded 29 October 1996, as a private league company, with league independence from the German Basketball Federation (DBB). In 1998, the BBL became the BBL GmbH, of which the AG BBL e.V., comprising the clubs of the German Basketball League, own a 74% controlling share, and the German Basketball Federation (DBB) with 26%.

See also
German Basketball League (BBL)
German Basketball Federation (DBB)

References

External links
BBL Struktur 

Basketball Bundesliga
Basketball governing bodies in Europe
Bas
Sports organizations established in 1996
1996 establishments in Germany